Ave is an Estonian feminine given name.

As of 1 January 2021, 1,526 women in Estonia have the first name Ave, making it the 120th most popular female name in the country. The name is most commonly found in Pärnu County, where 16.93 per 10,000 women bear the name. Notable people bearing the name Ave include:

Ave Alavainu (born 1942), poet
Ave-Lii Laas (born 1999), footballer
Ave Laanoja (born 1948), actress
Ave Pajo (born 1984), footballer
Ave Suija (born 1969), lichenologist

References

Feminine given names
Estonian feminine given names